Ode to Venus is the second full-length album recorded by Niemen.  It was released in Germany by European part of Columbia, and was created with notable help of Reinhold Mack and SBB.

Track listing 
 "Ode to Venus" - 6:37 (lyrics: Czesław Niemen)
 "Puppets" - 4:38 (lyrics: Cyprian Kamil Norwid)
 "From the First Major Discoveries" - 9:33 (lyrics: Leszek Aleksander Moczulski)
 "What Have I Done" - 5:43 (lyrics: Bolesław Leśmian)
 "Fly Over Fields of Yellow Sunflowers" - 4:02 (lyrics: Paweł Brodowski)
 "What a Beautiful Woman You Are" - 4:20 (lyrics: Brodowski)
 "A Pilgrim" - 4:09 (lyrics: Norwid)
 "Rock for Mack" - 2:04 (instrumental)

All Polish to English lyric translations by Paweł Brodowski.

Personnel 
 Czesław Niemen - vocal, flute, keyboards 
 Józef Skrzek - organ, electric piano, bass, clavinet, harmonica, violin
 Apostolis Anthimos - guitar
 Jerzy Piotrowski - drums

References 

Czesław Niemen albums
1973 albums